James Byron Chan (born 13 June 1969) is a Papua New Guinean politician and the son of the former Prime Minister Sir Julius Chan. He was a People's Progress Party member of the National Parliament of Papua New Guinea from 2002 until 2017, representing the electorate of Namatanai Open. The son of former Prime Minister of Papua New Guinea Julius Chan, he defeated the late Ephraim Apelis at the 2002 election, and was twice re-elected before being defeated by Walter Schnaubelt at the 2017 election. Prior to his defeat, he served as Minister for Mining in the government of Peter O'Neill.

References

Members of the National Parliament of Papua New Guinea
Living people
People's Progress Party politicians
1969 births
Papua New Guinean people of Chinese descent
Papua New Guinean politicians of Chinese descent
People from Matalai
People from Namatanai
People from New Ireland Province